The Ricken Pass is a mountain pass in the canton of St. Gallen in eastern Switzerland.

The pass is crossed by a road, which has a maximum gradient of 9%.

References

Mountain passes of Switzerland
Mountain passes of the canton of St. Gallen
Toggenburg